Ghersi is a surname. Notable people with the surname include:

Alejandra Ghersi (born 1989), Venezuelan record producer, DJ, singer, and songwriter
Enrique Ghersi (born 1961), Peruvian lawyer and professor
Pietro Ghersi (1899–1972), Italian motorcycle racer

See also
Hersi